was a Japanese judoka. Born in Kagoshima, Japan, he received a silver medal at the 1956 World Judo Championships in Tokyo, behind winner Shokichi Natsui. He won the All-Japan Judo Championships three times.

References

External links

1920 births
1988 deaths
Japanese male judoka
20th-century Japanese people